Italpinas Development Corporation (IDC) is an Italian-Filipino design and real estate development firm, headed by Italian architect Romolo V. Nati (Chairman and CEO) and Filipino lawyer Jose D. Leviste III (President). The real estate development firm held its initial public offering (IPO) on Monday, December 7, 2015.

History 

IDC was established in 2009 by Nati and Leviste, envisioning a “green future” for the Philippines. Its principal services are real estate development and general design, including architectural, site-planning and survey, construction, interior design and management with specialization of alternative and environmentally friendly design.  IDC also specializes in green housing design and construction.  Additionally, IDC also renders marketing and financial management and planning. It was originally called Italpinas Euroasian Design and Eco-Development Corporation (ITPI Corp.). In 2010 IDC finished its first project, Primavera Residences, a residential condominium in Cagayan de Oro, Philippines.

IDC won the 2014 Pacific Property Award for Best Mixed-Use Development in the Philippines and the  2011 Southeast Asia Property Award (SEAPA) for Best Condo Development in the Philippines. The company was also a finalist in the Most Promising Clean Energy Investment Opportunities at the 2010 CTI-PFAN Asia Forum for Clean Energy.

Projects 

 Primavera City - (Cagayan de Oro) IDC's second ground breaking project located in Uptown Cagayan de Oro. This project is a seven-tower building with the first six composed of commercial, office and residential units in a total of twelve floors while the seventh is a 32-storey hotel tower. This integrated building is designed with both passive and active green strategies such as semi-transparent photovoltaic panels, rain harvesting and cooling system.
 Primavera Residences – (Cagayan de Oro) The first eco-friendly mixed-use development in Cagayan de Oro, a 10-storey twin-building complex comprising residential, commercial and office spaces. The complex is designed with passive cooling features that minimize the impact on the environment.
 Verona Green Apartments – (Cagayan de Oro) New joint venture project in Uptown Cagayan de Oro. And just recently, IDC stated that VERONA GREEN APARTMENTS consisting of a series of four-storey walk-up green buildings offering both residential and commercial space would be the company’s first venture into the economic housing market.
 Coral City – (Quezon City, Philippines) A 30,000 square-meter self-sustaining and weather-proof architectural design concept for a mixed-use socialized housing project (residential and commercial). The design will include courtyards, flood-proof shelters and parking spaces.
 Miramonti – (Santo Tomas, Batangas) An advanced green complex comprising residential, commercial and parking spaces. The complex will be using renewable and self-sustaining energy while also boasting passive cooling technology in the complex.
 A Shelter of Light – (Payatas, Quezon City) A design concept using recyclable materials for an eco-friendly, self-sustaining multipurpose public hall in Payatas, Quezon City

Honors and awards
 2019, Best Mixed-use Development in the Philippines, "Miramonti Green Residences", International Property Awards (Asia Pacific)
2018, Best Innovation Project of the Year 2018, "Miramonti Green Residences", The Outlook - Lamudi; Manila, Philippines
2017, Best Mixed-use Development in the Philippines, "Primavera City", International Property Awards (Asia Pacific)
 2016, Leadership in Green Building Award 2016, Philippine Green Building Council, “Primavera Residences” ; Taguig, Philippines
 2015, EDGE ( Excellence in Design for Greater Efficiencies), ”Primavera Residences”,  IFC World Bank
 2014, Best Mixed-use Development in the Philippines, "Primavera Residences", Internationational Property Awards (Asia Pacific); Kuala Lumpur, Malaysia
 2014, One of the Philippines’ New Business Leaders, National Geographic Magazine (Feb 2014)
 2013, One of the Most Promising Clean Energy Investment Opportunity, “Primavera Residences", CTI-PFAN
 2011, One of the Best Condo Development in the Philippines, “Primavera Residences”; South East Asia Property Awards, Singapore
 2010, The Most Promising Clean Energy Investment Opportunities, “Primavera Residences”; CTI-PFA

References 

 Italpinas bags int’l. property award for Primavera Residences in CDO The Philippine Star. (April 4, 2014)
 Italpinas plan cited among Asia’s top nexgen clean energy projects Gold Star Daily.  (March 12, 2013)
 The Intelligent Investor. “The Philippines: The New Business Leaders.” National Geographic February 2014: 19-20. Print.
 Developer gives tips on building structures for extreme weather conditions GMA News Online. (November 24, 2013)
 "Italpinas gets Eco-Logic trademark".  Business World, p. 6. (May 14, 2014)

Real estate companies of the Philippines
Architecture firms of the Philippines
Companies based in Makati
Companies listed on the Philippine Stock Exchange